Eider is a French brand and a company that makes sports garments for mountaineering and ice climbing.

History
Eider was founded in 1962. Eider has become a subsidiary of Lafuma in June 2008. Eider, along with Lafuma, has made in-roads in the South Korean sports equipment market since 2009.

External links
  https://web.archive.org/web/20110831041859/http://www.eider-world.com/
  https://web.archive.org/web/20110907082907/http://www.eider.tv/

References

Clothing brands of France
Clothing companies established in 1962
French companies established in 1962